Zila may refer to:

Zile
Zila (country subdivision)
Zila-ye Aliasgar, a village in Khuzestan Province, Iran
A jazz group formed by South African saxophonist Dudu Pukwana
Zila Bezerra (born 1945), Brazilian teacher and politician

See also
 Zilla (disambiguation)